The 1890 Ayr Burghs by-election was a parliamentary by-election held for the British House of Commons constituency of Ayr Burghs in 1890. The seat had become vacant when the sitting Liberal Party Member of Parliament John Sinclair retired.

The Conservative candidate, James Somervell won the seat.

The result

References

See also
 List of United Kingdom by-elections (1885-1900)

1890 elections in the United Kingdom
1890 in Scotland
1890s elections in Scotland
By-elections to the Parliament of the United Kingdom in Scottish constituencies
March 1890 events